is a 1990 Japanese film directed by Kazuyuki Izutsu.

Awards
12th Yokohama Film Festival
 Best Actor - Masato Furuoya
 7th Best Film

References

External links
 

1990 films
Films directed by Kazuyuki Izutsu
Japanese drama films
1990s Japanese films